WZZL (106.7 FM) is a radio station licensed to the community of Reidland, Kentucky, and serves the greater Paducah, Kentucky, area. The station is owned by Withers Broadcasting and licensed to Withers Broadcasting Company of Paducah, LLC.

History
The station was assigned the WZZL call letters by the Federal Communications Commission on November 1, 1992.

Programming
WZZL has been airing a mainstream rock format since inception. It opened in 1992 by playing "In the Air Tonight" by Phil Collins for 24 hours.

The station also carried the syndicated The Bob & Tom Show weekday mornings, until January 2016. On January 11 WZZL began airing The Free Beer and Hot Wings Show weekday mornings from 4 a.m. to 9 a.m.

In January 2017, WZZL switched slogans from "'ZZL Rocks" to "Everything That Rocks", as they were increasing their classic rock and classic alternative selections, to better compete with WJLI and sister station KGMO. To further showcase the move towards classic rock, their television commercial featured only classic rock artists and songs.

Current line-up
As of March 2021 the on-air line-up for WZZL is as follows:

Weekdays
 The Free Beer and Hot Wings Show 4a-9a
 Cash 9a-2p
 Chris 2p-7p
 Leah 7p-12a

Weekends
 The Free Beer and Hot Wings Show (Best Of) 4a-9a
 The remainder of the weekend runs with rotating Air Personalities.

References

External links
WZZL official website

ZZL
Active rock radio stations in the United States